Café del Mar ("Sea Café") is a bar located in Sant Antoni de Portmany, Ibiza, established in 1980. In 1999, it founded the record label Café del Mar Music, known for its series of chillout CDs. 

Today, Café del Mar is a bar brand that includes a bar in Ibiza and 11 bars elsewhere in the world, including Malta.

History 
The Café del Mar was founded on 20 June 1980. The look of the Café del Mar was designed by architect Lluis Güell. He was in charge of the design, decoration and architecture.

DJ José Padilla who became famous for his sunset sets that began in 1991 at Cafe del Mar. Padilla died on October 22, 2020 of colonic cancer. He created the first six volumes of Cafe del Mar compilation albums between 1994 and 1999.

Café del Mar Music 

Café del Mar Music releases balearic ambient, easy listening music. The collections of the music played at the café were first sold on cassette at the end of the 1980s. Starting circa 1994, Café del Mar compilation CDs have been released by various labels. In 1999, the owner of the cafe founded the Café del Mar Music label. As of April 2017 a total of twenty-two volumes of the main compilation series have been published.

Café Del Mar hosted the DJs Phil Mison, Jim Breese, and Chris Coco who recorded a few songs as 3 Balearos in 2012, including the famous single "Summer breezin'".

Artists 
Café del Mar compilations contain music by Pat Metheny, A. R. Rahman, Moby, Jean Michel Jarre, Chicane, Underworld, Rhian Sheehan, Afterlife - Steve Miller, Linda Di Franco, Triangle Sun and [[Thomas Newman],[Gary B].

Releases 
Lil Jufu - Who R U?

Other labels
 Café Del Mar,  (January 1993) Eye Q Records
 Café Del Mar - Volumen Cuatro, (1999) Manifesto Records (UK)

Café del Mar Music releases
 Aria, (1999) produced by Paul Schwartz, (originally released in 1997 by Astor Place)
 Aria 2 - New Horizons, (1999) produced by Paul Schwartz
 Café Del Mar - Chillhouse Mix 5, (2007)

Radio and livestreaming 
Cafe del Mar began live streaming via their YouTube channel on September 28, 2020. The live stream is titled "Café del Mar Ibiza Live Chillout Radio & Webcam 24/7" and streams purely chillout music without any vocal activity from a DJ. Common artists featured include Everything but the Girl, Groove Armada, Afterlife, Nightmares on Wax, Cathy Battistessa and Sade.

Brand 
Today, Café del Mar is a bar brand that includes a bar in Ibiza and 11 bars elsewhere in the world, including Malta (Café del Mar Malta).

References

External links 

 Café del Mar official site
 Café del Mar Brand official site
 Café del Mar Music official site

Culture of Ibiza
Ambient music record labels
Compilation album series branded by bars and cafés
Restaurants established in 1978
1990s compilation albums
2000s compilation albums
Restaurants in Spain
Coffeehouses and cafés in Spain
Spanish companies established in 1978